Jack E. Hickel (born October 1, 1950, in Anchorage, Alaska) is an American physician and humanitarian.

Biography 
Hickel was born in Anchorage, Alaska, the fourth of six children (all sons) of Wally Hickel, former United States Secretary of the Interior under President Richard Nixon and two-time governor of Alaska. His mother was Ermalee Hickel, noted Alaska humanitarian. He is married to Josie Hickel, president of commercial holdings for Chugach Alaska Corporation.

A graduate of the University of Washington School of Medicine, Hickel spent 15 years during the 1980s and 1990s as a medical missionary in Swaziland. In 1997, he returned to his home state of Alaska where he continues to practice as a family physician with the Alaska Native Medical Center.

After a 2007 visit to the village of Old Fangak, Sudan (now South Sudan), Hickel helped found the Alaska Sudan Medical Project (ASMP). Incorporated in 2008, the ASMP drills wells, offers training, promotes agriculture, and provides health care in an area suffering under years of ongoing civil wars. In 2013, the ASMP achieved a primary goal with the construction of a new village clinic.

In recent years, Hickel has also been an active member of Alaska's Permanent Fund Defenders, a non-partisan and non-profit advocacy group to the defense of the Alaska Permanent Fund, which preserves and shares income from Alaska's natural resources for all residents. Among his advocacy efforts, Hickel has written several editorials in defense of the Permanent Fund and the preservation of the Fund's annual dividend to all Alaskans.

References

External links 
Permanent Fund Defenders
Alaska Sudan Medical Project

1950 births
People from Anchorage, Alaska
Writers from Alaska
Living people
University of Washington School of Medicine alumni
Physicians from Alaska
Activists from Alaska
American humanitarians